"Over My Head" is a song recorded by American indie pop band Echosmith. The Sierota siblings co-wrote the song with Leroy Clampitt, Jeffrey David, Cara Salimando, and Paul Guy Shelton. Following the release of the EP Inside a Dream, "Over My Head" was released digitally on March 16, 2018 through Warner Bros. Records as the intended lead single of the band’s second studio album, however it was eventually scrapped from the album. It impacted hot adult contemporary radio on March 19, 2018.

Composition
"Over My Head" is composed of a synth-heavy chorus, an "addicting" melody, and a pronounced drum beat. Critics noted the song's sound is more "evolved" and mature than previous releases.

The song is written in the key of F# Minor, and follows a chord progression of D-Bm-F#m (VI-iv-i). The tempo of the song is 105 beats per minute.

Critical reception
Markos Papadatos of Digital Journal wrote that the song is delightful and "displays [the band's] growth and maturity." He gave the song an A rating.

Chart performance
"Over My Head" entered the Billboard Adult Pop Songs chart dated April 7, 2018 at number 35 and was the week's highest-debuting single.

Music video
A lyric video premiered accompanying the song's digital release on March 16, 2018. A collaboration with latte artist Melannie Aquino and Lavazza, the clip features the song's lyrics depicted in espresso foam.

The official music video for the song was directed by Sophia Muller and premiered March 20, 2018. The video features the black turtleneck outfits worn on the single cover and the block letter lights spelling Echosmith that the band use on tour.

Credits and personnel
Adapted from single credits on AllMusic.

Echosmith
 Graham Sierota – drums
 Noah Sierota – bass, guitar, programming, vocals
 Sydney Sierota – vocals

Other personnel
 Sergio Chavez – engineering
 Todd Copper – engineering
 Chris Gehringer – mastering
 Serban Ghenea – mixing
 John Hanes – mix engineering
 Cara Salimando – backing vocals
 Paul "Phamous" Guy Shelton – backing vocals
 Leroy Clampitt – drum programming, engineering, production, synthesizer programming, backing vocals

Charts

Release history

References

2018 songs
2018 singles
Echosmith songs
Warner Records singles
Songs written by Leroy Clampitt